Kunani District is a district (bakhsh) in Kuhdasht County, Lorestan Province, Iran. At the 2006 census, its population was 21,786, in 4,305 families.  The District has one city: Kunani.  The District contains two Rural Districts: Kunani Rural District and Zirtang Rural District.

References 

Districts of Lorestan Province
Kuhdasht County